The Compton wavelength is a quantum mechanical property of a particle. The Compton wavelength of a particle is equal to the wavelength of a photon whose energy is the same as the rest energy of that particle (see mass–energy equivalence). It was introduced by Arthur Compton in 1923 in his explanation of the scattering of photons by electrons (a process known as Compton scattering).

The standard Compton wavelength  of a particle is given by

while its frequency  is given by

The significance of this formula is shown in the derivation of the Compton shift formula.

Other particles have different Compton wavelengths.

Reduced and Relativistic Compton wavelengths
The reduced Compton wavelength  (barred lambda) is defined as the Compton wavelength divided by :

where  is the reduced Planck constant.

Further the relativistic Compton Wavelength is given by

 where :       and is known as the Lorentz factor.

Though this form is unpopular on account of its dependence on the institution of relativistic mass as originally described by Lorentz in 1899. While the derivation of the traditional Compton Wavelength is observed indirectly via Compton Scattering (where the wavelength is calculated based on the incoming and outgoing wavelength and angle of photons colliding with the particle in question) requires the particle to be at rest, this relativistic formula allows the same calculation to be conducted even in the case of an initially moving particle.

Role in equations for massive particles
The inverse reduced Compton wavelength is a natural representation for mass on the quantum scale, and as such, it appears in many of the fundamental equations of quantum mechanics. The reduced Compton wavelength appears in the relativistic Klein–Gordon equation for a free particle:

It appears in the Dirac equation (the following is an explicitly covariant form employing the Einstein summation convention):

The reduced Compton wavelength also appears in Schrödinger's equation, although its presence is obscured in traditional representations of the equation. The following is the traditional representation of Schrödinger's equation for an electron in a hydrogen-like atom:

Distinction between reduced and non-reduced
The reduced Compton wavelength is a natural representation of mass on the quantum scale. Equations that pertain to inertial mass like Klein–Gordon and Schrödinger's, use the reduced Compton wavelength.

Equations that pertain to the wavelengths of photons interacting with mass use the non-reduced Compton wavelength. Compton wavelength for this particle is the wavelength of a photon of the same energy. For photons of frequency , energy is given by

Limitation on measurement
The Compton wavelength expresses a fundamental limitation on measuring the position of a particle, taking into account quantum mechanics and special relativity.

This limitation depends on the mass  of the particle.
To see how, note that we can measure the position of a particle by bouncing light off it – but measuring the position accurately requires light of short wavelength. Light with a short wavelength consists of photons of high energy. If the energy of these photons exceeds , when one hits the particle whose position is being measured the collision may yield enough energy to create a new particle of the same type. This renders moot the question of the original particle's location.

This argument also shows that the reduced Compton wavelength is the cutoff below which quantum field theory – which can describe particle creation and annihilation – becomes important. The above argument can be made a bit more precise as follows. Suppose we wish to measure the position of a particle to within an accuracy . Then the uncertainty relation for position and momentum says that

so the uncertainty in the particle's momentum satisfies

But we must exclude this greater energy uncertainty. Physically, this is excluded by the creation of one or more additional particles to keep the momentum uncertainty of each particle at or below . In particular the minimum uncertainty is when the scattered photon has limit energy equal to the incident observing energy. It follows that there is a fundamental minimum for :

Thus the uncertainty in position must be greater than half of the reduced Compton wavelength .

The Compton wavelength can be contrasted with the de Broglie wavelength, which depends on the momentum of a particle and determines the cutoff between particle and wave behavior in quantum mechanics. Notably, de Broglie's derivation of the de Broglie wavelength is based on the assumption that an observed particle is associated with a periodic phenomenon of the particle's Compton frequency.

Relationship to other constants
Typical atomic lengths, wave numbers, and areas in physics can be related to the reduced Compton wavelength for the electron  and the electromagnetic fine-structure constant 

The Bohr radius is related to the Compton wavelength by:

The classical electron radius is about 3 times larger than the proton radius, and is written:

The Rydberg constant, having dimensions of linear wavenumber, is written:

This yields the sequence:

For fermions, the reduced Compton wavelength sets the cross-section of interactions. For example, the cross-section for Thomson scattering of a photon from an electron is equal to

which is roughly the same as the cross-sectional area of an iron-56 nucleus. For gauge bosons, the Compton wavelength sets the effective range of the Yukawa interaction: since the photon has no mass, electromagnetism has infinite range.

The Planck mass is the order of mass for which the Compton wavelength and the Schwarzschild radius  are the same, when their value is close to the Planck length. The Schwarzschild radius is proportional to the mass, whereas the Compton wavelength is proportional to the inverse of the mass. The Planck mass and length are defined by:

Geometrical interpretation
A geometrical origin of the Compton wavelength has been demonstrated using semiclassical equations describing the motion of a wavepacket. In this case, the Compton wavelength is equal to the square root of the quantum metric, a metric describing the quantum space:

See also
 de Broglie wavelength
 Planck–Einstein relation

References

External links
 Length Scales in Physics: the Compton Wavelength
 B.G. Sidharth, Planck scale to Compton scale, International Institute for Applicable Mathematics, Hyderabad (India) & Udine (Italy), Aug 2006.
 E.G. Haug, Relativistic Compton Wavelength, European Journal of Applied Physics, volume 4, 2022.

Atomic physics
Foundational quantum physics

de:Compton-Effekt#Compton-Wellenlänge